The Canadian Forces Health Services Group (CF H Svcs Gp) is a formation of the Canadian Forces within the Military Personnel Command. It includes personnel from both the Royal Canadian Medical Service and the Royal Canadian Dental Corps, fulfills all military health system functions from education and clinical services to research and public health, and is composed of health professionals from over 40 occupations and specialties in over 120 units and detachments across Canada and abroad.

Structure

In May 2017 the group's national headquarters (CF H Svcs Gp HQ) moved from the former National Defence Medical Centre to the new NDHQ Carling Campus, in Ottawa, Ontario.

It has two subordinate regional headquarters. Each Health Services Group is made up of CF health services centres and field ambulances (Regular and Reserve).
1 Health Services Group, with its headquarters located in Edmonton, Alberta, is responsible for all health services units from Thunder Bay, Ontario, to the west coast. Commanded by Captain(N) Jeff Biddiscombe. It includes 1 Field Ambulance, 11 (Victoria) Field Ambulance, 12 (Vancouver) Field Ambulance, 15 Field Ambulance, 16 (Regina) Field Ambulance, 17 (Winnipeg) Field Ambulance and 18 (Thunder Bay) Field Ambulance.
4 Health Services Group with its headquarters in Montreal, Quebec, is responsible for all health services units in the remainder of Ontario to the east coast. 4 Health Services Group is commanded by Colonel Martin Brochu. 2 Field Ambulance is co-located with 2 Canadian Mechanized Brigade Group at CFB Petawawa. 4 Health Services Group also includes 23 Field Ambulance, Hamilton, London, Windsor; 25 Field Ambulance, Toronto; 28 Field Ambulance, Ottawa; 33 Field Ambulance, Halifax; 35 Field Ambulance, Sydney, St. John's, Saint John; 51 Field Ambulance, Montreal; 52 Field Ambulance, Sherbrooke; and 55 Field Ambulance, Quebec City, all of which are reserve units.

The national headquarters is composed of several functional directorates reporting to the Commander:

Deputy Commander:
Director Health Services Operations
Director Health Services Reserves
Director Health Services Personnel
Comptroller
A number of national elements report directly to the deputy commander and not to either of the regional headquarters including:
Canadian Forces Health Services Training Centre
Canadian Forces Environmental Medicine Establishment
Canadian Forces Health Services Centre Ottawa
Central Medical Equipment Depot
1 Canadian Field Hospital including Detachment Ottawa (formerly known as the Canadian Forces Health Services Primary Reserve List)
1 Dental Unit
Or to the Surgeon General:
Deputy Surgeon General
Director Medical Policy
Director Force Health Protection
Director Mental Health
Each service chief has a senior medical advisor: Royal Canadian Navy Surgeon, Canadian Army Surgeon, and Royal Canadian Air Force Surgeon. There is also a Canadian Special Forces Command surgeon.
Deputy Director General Health Services
Deputy Chief of Staff/Headquarters Commanding Officer
Director Corporate Services
Director Health Services Strategy
Director Health Services Capability Development
Chief Dental Officer/Director Dental Services
Director Quality and Performance
Director Clinical Strategy and Innovation
Health Services Secretariat includes public affairs, legal advisor, policy and records, and privacy that advise both the commander and surgeon-general.

Training

School of Operational Medicine (SOM)
The School of Operational Medicine (SOM) in Toronto, Ontario forms a part of the Canadian Forces Environmental Medicine Establishment. In turn the Canadian Forces Environmental Medicine Establishment is the military component of the Defence Research and Development Canada. The School of Operational Medicine (SOM) conducts all Flight Surgeon training. In addition, it offers courses at various levels in Diving Medicine, to Physicians, Medical technicians and Physician Assistants.

Canadian Forces School of Survival and Aeromedical Training
The Canadian Forces School of Survival and Aeromedical Training (CFSSAT) in Winnipeg, Manitoba, provides initial and continuation training for all CF aircrew. The training covers diverse topics including life support equipment and human factors, search and evasion as well as disorientation and night vision.

References

External links

 Canadian Forces Medical Service—Introduction to its History and Heritage
Canadian Forces Recruiting
Critical Care On the Battlefield and Around the World: The Story of the Canadian Forces Health Services—Canadian War Museum
Canadian Forces and Department of National Defence
Canadian Forces Schools

Canadian Armed Forces personnel branches
Canadian Armed Forces
Military history of Canada